Heimann is a surname. Notable people with the surname include:

Aage Heimann (1900–1956), Danish field hockey player, competed in the 1928 Summer Olympics
Andreas Heimann (born 1992), German chessplayer
Betsy Faith Heimann, costume designer in Hollywood
Caja Heimann (1918–1988), Danish film actress
Eduard Heimann (1889–1967), German economist and social scientist
Hugo Heimann (1859–1951), German publisher politician
John G. Heimann, American Comptroller of the Currency from 1977 to 1981
Nadine Heimann, American actress
Niclas Heimann (born 1991), German footballer
Rolf Heimann (born 1940), Australian author, cartoonist and illustrator
Sherry Heimann (born 1944), American former actress and film studio executive
Heimann Joseph Michael (1792–1846), Hebrew bibliographer born at Hamburg
Heimann Hariton Tiktin (1850–1936), Silesian-born Romanian Jewish linguist and academic

See also
Heidemann
Heilmann
Heiman
Heinemann (disambiguation)
Heinzmann
Heitmann
Heitzmann